is a 1998 Japanese Sega Model 3 arcade action game that was later ported to the Sega NAOMI arcades and the Dreamcast home console in Japan in 1999 and North America in 2000. Oratorio Tangram is a 3D fighting game where the player assumes control of a giant humanoid robot, and is a sequel to the 1996 video game Virtual On: Cyber Troopers. A re-release of the game, entitled , was released worldwide for Xbox 360 on April 29, 2009.

Plot 
The game starts 20 years after the events of Operation Moongate. After the defeat of Z-Gradt, the mightiest VR and the final boss of the first game, humans continued to battle in their VR's, searching for supremacy. However an unknown AI known as Tangram has awakened and became self-conscious. With the directive to destroy humanity, Tangram infected Earth's mother computer with a virus called "Tangram Virus" and hacked into all VR systems, except for the player's VR. It plans to use the infected VRs to destroy the last human colonies that survived the previous war. The player begins the mission to defeat all VRs and destroy Tangram to stop its evil ambitions once and for all.

After defeating all VRs, the player is teleported to the Earth's mother computer system to fight Tangram. Depending on the final battle outcome, there are two endings available.

Good Ending: Tangram is erased from the computer and the player's VR is teleported back to Earth's stratosphere, where its armour is critically damaged during the fall but is saved by VRs that came on the Floating Carrier. Fei-Yen is saved by Angelan or the opposite and the others (Temjin, Raiden, Dodray, Bal-Bados, Specineff, Cypher, and Apharmd) are saved by the same model VRs.

Bad Ending: If the player's time counter reaches 0, Tangram hacks into the player's VR system and shuts it down, resulting in a Game Over screen.

Reception 

The Dreamcast version received favorable reviews, while Ver.5.66 received "average" reviews, according to the review aggregation websites GameRankings and Metacritic. Stephen Frost of NextGen called the Japanese import of the former console version "an impressive game, and practically a perfect conversion, marred by difficult controls and a lack of 'compatibility' with the standard Dreamcast controller. However, if you're willing to invest the necessary time, you'll eventually discover that the game provides one of the most addictive and deep gaming experiences currently available on Dreamcast."

In Japan, Famitsu gave the same Dreamcast version a score of three tens and one nine for a total of 39 out of 40. Game Machine listed the arcade version in their May 15, 1998 issue as the second most-successful dedicated arcade game of the month. GameSpot gave the same arcade version seven out of ten and said, "Provided you can get the twin sticks, Virtual On: Oratorio Tangram is a must-buy. Without the controller, or an edit-controller function, it's a must-avoid."

References

External links 
 
 

1998 video games
Activision games
Arcade video games
Dreamcast games
Sega arcade games
Sega video games
Virtual On
Xbox 360 Live Arcade games
Video games developed in Japan